Ealdred of Lindisfarne was Bishop of Lindisfarne, perhaps dying around 968.

Citations

References

External links 
 
 https://www.bl.uk/collection-items/lindisfarne-gospels

Bishops of Lindisfarne
10th-century English bishops
Year of birth unknown